Agu Aarna (11 October 1915 Tallinn – 11 December 1989 Tallinn) was an Estonian oil shale chemist and university rector.

Aarna graduated from Tallinn City Primary School No. 1 in 1919, then majored in surveying and cultural engineering at Tallinn University of Technology, graduating in 1934. From 1934 until 1936, he was graduate student at the Estonian Military Academy of Engineering, and graduated from the Military Technical School in Tallinn with a degree in pyrotechnics in 1940. He also studied at the Department of Chemistry of Tallinn University of Technology from 1937 until 1940 and 1942 until 1943. In 1945, he graduated cum laude  from Dresden University of Technology in chemistry. In 1956, he defended his doctoral thesis in Leningrad Institute of Technology.

From 1960 until 1976, he was the rector of Tallinn Polytechnical Institute. His son is computer scientist, academic and politician Olav Aarna.

References

1915 births
1989 deaths
People from Kreis Harrien
members of the Central Committee of the Communist Party of Estonia
Members of the Supreme Soviet of the Estonian Soviet Socialist Republic, 1959–1963
Members of the Supreme Soviet of the Estonian Soviet Socialist Republic, 1963–1967
Members of the Supreme Soviet of the Estonian Soviet Socialist Republic, 1967–1971
Estonian chemists
Oil shale researchers
Oil shale in Estonia
Soviet Army officers
Tallinn University of Technology alumni
Academic staff of the Tallinn University of Technology
Rectors of universities in Estonia
Soviet military personnel of World War II
Burials at Metsakalmistu
Scientists from Tallinn